Kemono Friends is a television anime series produced by Kadokawa, based on the smartphone game created by Nexon. The series revolves around Friends, anthropomorphised versions of various animals, as they go about their lives while occasionally fighting against monsters known as Ceruleans. The original anime series, written and directed by Tatsuki at Yaoyorozu, aired between January 10 and March 28, 2017, and was simulcast by Crunchyroll, who co-financed and licensed the series. Original content for TV Tokyo's AniTele service was released from April 1, 2017. An unofficial "episode 12.1" 2-minute short was uploaded by the director to Niconico and YouTube on April 5, 2017. Additional shorts have been created in collaboration with Japan Racing Association, Animelo Summer Live 2017, and Nissin Foods. The second season, directed by Ryuichi Kimura at Tomason and written by Takuya Matsumoto, aired from January 14 to April 1, 2019. The opening theme is "Notteke~ Japari Beat," by Dōbutsu Biscuits×PPP. The ending theme from episodes 1-5 is "Hoshi o Tsunagete" by Gothic×Luck. From episode 6-onwards, Gothic×Luck performed the series' second ending theme "Kimi wa Kaeru Basho." An original net animation mini-series based on the original mobile game, titled , began streaming on TV Tokyo's AnimeTele service from August 10, 2018. Crunchyroll began streaming the series from October 16, 2018.

Episode list

Kemono Friends (2017)

Specials

Kemono Friends 2 (2019)

Notes

References

Kemono Friends